Guzmania retusa is a plant species in the genus Guzmania. This species is native to Guyana, Colombia, Bolivia, Venezuela and Ecuador.

References

retusa
Flora of South America
Plants described in 1951